Dhanji Kanji Gandhi Suvarna Chandrak also known as Dhanji Kanji Gandhi Gold Medal, is a literary honour in Gujarat, India given by Gujarat Sahitya Sabha. Established in 1983, the award is conferred annually on the most outstanding literate for his significant contribution in Gujarati literature. Chinu Modi rejected this medal in 1994.

Recipients 

The list of the recipients of Dhanji Kanji Gandhi Suvarna Chandrak is as below:

References 

Awards established in 1983
1983 establishments in Gujarat
Gujarati literary awards